The women's doubles Tournament at the 2005 Pacific Life Open took place between March 7 and March 20 on the outdoor hard courts of the Indian Wells Tennis Garden in Indian Wells, California, United States. Virginia Ruano Pascual and Paola Suárez won the title, defeating Nadia Petrova and Meghann Shaughnessy in the final.

Seeds

Draw

Finals

Top half

Bottom half

Qualifying

Seeds

Qualifiers
  Maria Kirilenko /  María Emilia Salerni

Qualifying draw

References
 Official results archive (ITF)
 Official results archive (WTA)

Pacific Life Open - Women's Doubles
Doubles women